Lac de Batbielh is a very small lake in Hautes-Pyrénées, France, located approximately 2 km north of the French–Spanish border within the Pyrénées National Park. At an elevation of 2229 m, its surface area is 0.01 km2.

Lakes of Hautes-Pyrénées